Gaspar Ibáñez de Segovia Peralta y Mendoza (1628–1708), Marqués de Mondéjar, was a Spanish historian and bibliophile.

People from Madrid
1628 births
1708 deaths